The flag of the municipality of Utrecht was adopted on 5 July 1990 by the city council of Utrecht as the official municipal flag. The flag is bisected diagonally, with the upper right portion being white, and the lower left portion being red.

History
The history of Utrecht's flag dates back centuries to when the city had its own militia (the military civic guard) for defence.  The militia was divided into two sections, each represented by a monochromatic, triangular pennant — one white and one red. With the combination of the two pennants, the flag is visualized.

On April 27, 1948, the City Council adopted the following flag:

This flag is almost the same as the standard of the militia, but differs in its ratio of 2:3.  The patron saint of the city, Saint Martin, known in Dutch as Sint Maarten, is traditionally depicted on the two-tone city flag.  His depiction on the flag is based on a legendary scene in which he, on horseback, cuts his red cloak in half to give to a beggar.  Such scene is occasionally presented as the explanation for the Utrecht coat of arms, but is more so suspected to be an apocryphal legend.  In the 16th century, Saint Marten disappeared from the city flag.

Gallery

References

1952 establishments in the Netherlands
Flags of the Netherlands
Flags introduced in 1990
Red and white flags